In probability, statistics and related fields, the geometric process is a counting process, introduced by Lam in 1988. It is defined as

The geometric process.

The GP has been widely applied in reliability engineering

Below are some of its extensions.
 The α- series process.
 The threshold geometric process. A stochastic process  is said to be a threshold geometric process (threshold GP), if there exists real numbers  and integers  such that for each ,  forms a renewal process.
 The doubly geometric process.
 The semi-geometric process.
 The double ratio geometric process. We call the stochastic process the double-ratio geometric process (DRGP).

References

Point processes
Markov processes